Athena Lee (born Athena L. Bass; December 8, 1964) is an American drummer and actress. She is the younger sister of Mötley Crüe drummer Tommy Lee.

Career
Lee was born in Los Angeles County, California, the daughter of David Lee Thomas Bass, an American U.S. Army sergeant, and Vassiliki "Voula" Papadimitriou, Miss Greece for the 1960 Miss World event. Her brother is rock drummer Tommy Lee. Athena Lee took an interest in music around age 20; two years later, she joined the all-female band Hardly Dangerous and the punk group Butt Trumpet. She then signed on and worked with KrunK. Aside from her musical career, she has also been a guest commentator on VH-1's Behind the Music and E! True Hollywood Story.

Lee was voted for, and won, "Best Female Drummer" at the Rock City Awards Show. In the 7th Annual L.A. Music Awards, she was nominated for "Best Drummer (Males and Females)" category. She was the first female ever nominated in the history of the L.A. Music Awards.

As of 2011, Lee plays drums with various artists and is endorsed by Rockett Drumworks. Her book, Coming in Second, was published in October 2011. Since 2012, she has been a cast member of the Fuse reality TV series Ex-Wives of Rock (which also features her brother's bandmate Vince Neil's ex-wife Sharise Neil).

Personal life
Athena had a daughter with John Guerrero in 1991. Lee's first husband was Scott Atkins, a former bandmate. They had a son born in 1992.  She was later married to James Kottak, ex-drummer of the German rock band Scorpions. They had one child together, born in 1997, but have since divorced.

References

External links
Ahead Drumsticks: Athena Lee
 

1964 births
Living people
American women drummers
American people of Greek descent
Musicians from California
20th-century American drummers
21st-century American drummers
20th-century American women musicians
21st-century American women musicians